Pronothrotherium is an extinct genus of ground sloths from Argentina and Uruguay. Fossils of Pronothrotherium have been found in the Ituzaingó Formation of Argentina.

References 

Prehistoric sloths
Prehistoric placental genera
Miocene xenarthrans
Miocene mammals of South America
Huayquerian
Miocene Argentina
Fossils of Argentina
Miocene Uruguay
Fossils of Uruguay
Ituzaingó Formation
Fossil taxa described in 1907
Taxa named by Florentino Ameghino
Neogene Argentina